The lomphok (literally, "piled up and layered-wrapped head cover") is a ceremonial headgear of Thailand, historically worn by royalty and nobility. It is a tall pointed hat, made of white cloth wrapped around a bamboo frame. The lomphok is believed to have been adapted from the turbans of Safavid-dynasty Persia during the Ayutthaya period, and its use is extensively documented by European writers who came into contact with Siam during the reign of King Narai. In particular, its use by Kosa Pan and the other diplomats of the embassy to the court of Louis XIV in 1686 became a sensation in French society. Today, the lomphok can be seen worn by officials in the Royal Ploughing Ceremony and royal funeral processions.

Gallery

References

Thai headgear